Treaty Oak may refer to:
Treaty Oak (Austin, Texas)
Treaty Oak (Jacksonville, Florida)
Treaty Oak (New York, New York)
Treaty Oak (Washington, D.C.)